The Amazing Adventures of the Living Corpse is a 2012 American animated 3D horror film directed by Justin Paul Ritter, written by Ritter and Ryan Plato, and starring Michael Villar as an intelligent zombie who seeks to protect his son.  It is based on The Living Corpse Exhumed, a comic book by Ken Haeser and Buz Hasson.

Plot 

As a zombie apocalypse begins, a group of zombies attack the residents in a house.  When the family recognizes one of the zombies as a family member, the zombie is shocked back to his senses and decides to protect his family.

Cast 
 Michael Villar as the Living Corpse

Release 
The Amazing Adventures of the Living Corpse premiered at the 2012 San Diego Comic Con.  Four days later, it was picked up for distribution by Anchor Bay Entertainment.  Director Ritter delayed the release of the film several times so that he could fix issues with it.  It was released on home video on June 18, 2013.

Reception 
Gordon Sullivan of DVD Verdict said, "For most viewers the story isn't coherent enough to justify the low-tech animation."  Ryan Keefer of DVD Talk rated the film 2/5 stars and said, "The corpse's adventures are less amazing and more mundane."  Todd Dugan of The Digital Bits rated it D− and said that he would not recommend it to either horror or animation fans.

References

External links 
 

2012 films
2010s American animated films
2012 horror films
2012 3D films
American animated horror films
American independent films
American zombie films
American 3D films
American animated feature films
Animated films based on comics
Films based on American comics
2012 animated films
American action horror films
Animated action films
Superhero horror films
2012 fantasy films
American animated fantasy films
2010s animated superhero films
American vigilante films
3D animated films
American exploitation films
2010s English-language films